Libertyville Township is a township in Lake County, Illinois, USA.  As of the 2010 census, its population was 53,139. The village of Libertyville is part of the township, as are parts of Green Oaks, Lake Bluff, Lake Forest, Mettawa, Mundelein, North Chicago, Rondout, Vernon Hills and Waukegan.

Geography
Lakes in this township include Big Bear Lake, Butler Lake, Harvey Lake, Liberty Lake, Little Bear Lake, Minear Lake and West Lake. The stream of Bull Creek runs through this township, before depositing into the Des Plaines River.

Open space
In 1985, Libertyville Township established the first Township Open Space District in Illinois. This innovative land protection program was funded by a 22.6 million-dollar bond referendum approved by the residents of Libertyville Township. The Open Space Bond was retired fully paid in October 2003. Two of these sites, Oak Openings and Liberty Prairie, have also received the state's highest protection status as Illinois Nature Preserves.

Cities and towns
 Green Oaks
 Lake Forest (western edge)
 Libertyville 
 Mettawa (northwest portion)
 Mundelein (eastern edge)
 North Chicago (western edge)
 Vernon Hills (northern half)
 Waukegan (western edge)

Census-designated place 
 Knollwood CDP (western edge)

Unincorporated towns
 Rondout

Adjacent townships
 Warren Township (north)
 Waukegan Township (northeast)
 Shields Township (east)
 West Deerfield Township (southeast)
 Vernon Township (south)
 Ela Township (southwest)
 Fremont Township (west)
 Avon Township (northwest)

Cemeteries
The township contains four cemeteries: Ascension, Lake County Poor Farm, Lakeside and the Serbian Monastery Cemetery.

Major highways
 Interstate 94
 U.S. Route 45
 Illinois State Route 21
 Illinois State Route 43
 Illinois State Route 60
 Illinois State Route 137
 Illinois State Route 176

Airports and landing strips
 Condell Memorial Hospital Heliport

Demographics

Notable people
Phil Collins, presidential nominee of the Prohibition Party

References
 U.S. Board on Geographic Names (GNIS)
 United States Census Bureau cartographic boundary files

External links
 Libertyville Township official website
 US-Counties.com
 City-Data.com
 US Census
 Illinois State Archives

Townships in Lake County, Illinois
Townships in Illinois